Ecclesia Gnostica (Latin: The Church of Gnosis) is an open sacramental neo-Gnostic church in Los Angeles. It has ordained clergy and conducts regular sacramental services, including two weekly Masses (Celebration of the Holy Eucharist), as well as monthly and seasonal services in accordance with the liturgical calendar. It has active parishes in Seattle, Washington; Portland, Oregon; and Austin, Texas. The church and its affiliate organisation, The Gnostic Society, attempt to "advance the study, understanding, and the individual experience of Gnosis."

History

The organisation now called the Ecclesia Gnostica was originally organised in England under the name the Pre-Nicene Gnostic Catholic Church in 1953, by the Most Rev. Richard Jean Chretien Duc de Palatine with the object of "restoring the Gnosis – Divine Wisdom to the Christian Church, and to teach the Path of Holiness which leads to God and the Inner Illumination and Interior Communion with the Soul through the mortal body of man." Born Ronald Powell, Richard Duc de Palatine had served in the Liberal Catholic Church in Australia, before moving to England. Bishop Duc de Palatine was consecrated by the Most Rev. Msg. Hugh George de Willmott Newman (Mar Georgius I), patriarch of the Catholic Apostolic Church (Catholicate of the West) who consolidated many lines of apostolic succession.

Bishop Duc de Palatine also received a charter in 1953 to head an organisation first called "the Brotherhood of the Illuminati," renamed "the Order of the Pleroma" in 1960. He received other esoteric lines and charters such as: the Templar Order, Brotherhood of the Rosy Cross, Memphis and Mizraim Rites of Freemasonry, and the Martiniste Order, and termed the combination with the Ecumenical Apostolic Succession "the Wisdom Religion-Gnostic Mystic Tradition."

In 1959 the organisation became active in the United States through the work of Stephan A. Hoeller, who served as a priest of the church in Los Angeles, and was subsequently consecrated as regionary bishop for the Americas in 1967. He became presiding bishop on the death of Bishop Duc de Palatine in 1977, although there was a falling out prior to that.

The Ecumenical Apostolic Succession

Most Rev. Msg. Hugh George de Willmott Newman (Mar Georgius I) felt that all proper and valid consecrations and ordinations are equally efficacious regardless of the particular line of apostolic succession, but also that some degree of irregularity would attach itself to acts lacking ecumenical sanction. And so, to rectify any irregularity, and to overcome any doubts about validity of any line of apostolic succession, he sought and received conditional consecration from every part of the One Holy Catholic (Universal) and Apostolic church, bringing into being the Ecumenical Apostolic Succession. This Ecumenical line incorporates Syrian-Antiochene, Syrian-Malabar, Syrian-Gallican, Syro-Chaldean, Chaldean-Uniate, Coptic-Orthodox, Armenian-Uniate, Greek-Melkite, Russian-Orthodox, Russo-Syriac, Roman Catholic, Old Catholic, Liberal Catholic, Order of Corporate Reunion, Mariavite; and additional (disputed) lines of Anglican, Nonjuring, Celtic, Welsh, and Restored Apostolic (Irvingite).

All of these lines were passed to bishop Duc de Palatine at his consecration in 1953 and in a subsequent conditional consecration in 1955. They were then passed on to bishop Hoeller at his consecration in 1967.

Organisation

The presiding bishops of the church are: Most Rev. Stephan A. Hoeller, Regionary Bishop of the Americas; and Rt. Rev. Steven Marshall, auxiliary bishop. Bishop Hoeller is a leading exponent of Gnosticism as living religious practice, a professor of comparative religions, and scholar who has written and lectured extensively on Gnosticism, Jungian psychology, and esoteric subjects.

The scope of the organisation is best described as a liturgical orthopraxy, the organisation being focused on correct practice of the liturgical services offered by the church.

Participation

Neither the Ecclesia Gnostica nor the Gnostic Society have a formal, dues-paying membership. The activities of both are open to all, regardless of creed.

Clergy

Holy orders are considered one of the seven sacraments practised by the church. Clergy are of both major and minor holy orders. The major orders are: subdeacon, deacon, priest, and bishop. The five minor orders are: cleric, doorkeeper, reader, Exorcist, and Acolyte. Clergy formation (training) is progressive, with individuals being ordained to and serving in each order in succession. Formation of priests is generally over seven or more years. All levels of holy orders are open to both male and female; married, divorced, and single; and both gay and straight candidates. Clergy are self-sustaining, not receiving a salary from the church.

The Gnostic Society

The Gnostic Society is an organisation dedicated to advancing the study, the understanding and the individual experience of Gnosis, founded in 1928 by James Morgan Pryse. As an educational organisation associated with the Ecclesia Gnostica, the Gnostic Society presents weekly and monthly public lecture programs at Besant Lodge in Hollywood.

Teachings and doctrinal orientation

While Christian based on Gnosis rather than creed or acceptance from mainstream Christian churches, the church considers itself part of the fellowship of Universal Christendom, that is part of the One Holy Catholic (Universal) and Apostolic Church.

The Ecclesia Gnostica is a liturgical orthopraxy rather than an orthodoxy. Christian liturgy is central to the existence of the church, and in ritual and ornament the church is similar to Catholicism.

The church does not proselytise. There is not an exclusive claim of salvation; salvation is not dependent on participation in the church. Salvation is also understood differently from salvation in mainstream Christianity: salvation is achieved through Gnosis, described as "an inner 'knowingness,' a change of consciousness."

Gnosticism is grounded in the experience of Gnosis, which is the salvific and revelatory experience of transcendence. The experience of Gnosis receives expression in the Gnostic Mythology which allows the Gnostic to amplify and assimilate the experience of Gnosis and also makes further experience of Gnosis possible.

The aim of instruction is not just one variety of the Gnostic Mythos, but the entire heritage of the Gnostic tradition, which includes: primary sources such as the Nag Hammadi Library and much of the canonical Bible, with consideration of the less reliable accounts and recensions of teachings found in heresiological texts, the Hermetic writings, and the teachings of the Prophet Mani.

Understanding of the Gnostic tradition

While recognising the very pluralistic and creative elements of ancient Gnostic teachings they are seen as embracing a set of common assumptions which form the core of the Gnostic tradition. The "brief and inadequate outline" of this core given by bishop Hoeller is further summarised below:

The church does not require the acceptance of these teachings as a matter of belief. Although it states, "it is obvious that these teachings represent the distinctive contribution of the Gnostic tradition to religious thought and persons functioning within the tradition would find themselves in general agreement with them."

Worship and spiritual practice

Ecclesia Gnostica services consist of different liturgical celebrations usually based on traditional Western forms of Christian liturgy. Like ancient Gnostic groups, the Ecclesia Gnostica blends several disparate traditions. The church performs its sacraments "in accordance with the tradition of the Ancient Mystery Schools" and attempts to present them "in their original meaning as archetypal acts of ceremonial communion with the timeless realities of the soul."

The Gnostic Holy Eucharist

The celebration of the Gnostic Holy Eucharist is offered every Sunday in Los Angeles (and most other parishes). The Eucharist is central to the practice of the church, and is celebrated with high formality as congregants prepare to commune with "the indwelling and cosmic Christ." The service resembles a Traditional Roman Catholic liturgy in style, complete with elaborate vestments, burning candles, incense, and bells.

The service contains the Post-Eucharistic Benediction, "The peace of God which passeth all understanding, go with you. There is a power that makes all things new: It lives and moves in those who know the Self as one. May that peace brood over you, that Power uplift you into the Light, may It keep your hearts and minds in the knowledge and Love of God, and of His Son, our Lord the Christ."

Other sacraments

The Ecclesia Gnostica recognises five initiatory sacraments as listed in the Gospel of Philip: Baptism, Chrism or Confirmation, Eucharist, Redemption (Consolamentum) and Bride-Chamber, with the additional two sustaining sacraments of Holy Orders and Anointing of the Sick. (The sacraments of Penance and Matrimony are considered to be secondary sacraments having been substituted for those of Redemption and Bride-Chamber.) The initiatory sacraments of Baptism and Chrism or Confirmation and the two sustaining sacraments are offered by the church.

Devotional service to the Holy Sophia

In addition to the forms of liturgical service in the tradition of the Christian church, there is also the devotional service to the Holy Sophia that is unique to the rite of the Ecclesia Gnostica.

Liturgical calendar and lectionary

The church follows the traditional Western liturgical calendar with additions and emendations. These changes include the addition of observances of Gnostic church fathers and martyrs of the Gnostic tradition, and the re-dedication of the Marian feasts of Assumption and Nativity to the Assumption and Descent of the Holy Sophia (without decrying traditional Marian devotion).

The Lectionary, the book of collects, lessons (instead of epistles), and gospels, of the church was written, edited, and collected by bishop Stephan A. Hoeller and issued in 1974. Scriptures were collected from the Old and New Testament; the Pistis Sophia and other scriptures known before the Nag Hammadi find; the Nag Hammadi Library of the Gospel of Thomas, Gospel of Truth, and Gospel of Phillip; Cathar, Hermetic, Manichean, and Mandaean sources; and the Chaldean Oracles.

Both the calendar and the lectionary have been adopted for use by a number of other Gnostic church bodies.

Active parishes
 Sophia Diocesan Center, Los Angeles, CA. Most Rev. Stephan Hoeller, Presiding Bishop. Gnostic Society
 Queen of Heaven Gnostic Church, Portland, OR. Most Rev. Stephen Marshall, Bishop. 
 Hagia Sophia Church, Seattle, WA. Rev. Sam Osborne, Priest and Rector.
 Ecclesia Gnostica, Austin, Texas, TX. Rev. Peter Reardon, Priest and Rector.

References

External links
 The Ecclesia Gnostica

Gnosticism
1953 establishments in England
Christian organizations established in 1953
LGBT churches